Luther College is a co-educational independent secondary school of the Lutheran Church of Australia located in the outer-eastern suburb of Croydon Hills in Melbourne, Victoria, Australia. It maintains a close relationship with the Outer Eastern Lutheran Church parish of the Lutheran Church of Australia, which congregates in the school's chapel facilities. It provides education for years 7–12.

History 
Opened in 1964, Luther College is a school of the Lutheran Church of Australia, named for the father of the Lutheran Church, Dr. Martin Luther, a 16th-century German theologian.

Beginning as a boarding school with students from remote regional areas of Victoria making up a large percentage of its enrolment, the school grew to become popular with International students. However, after a decline in International enrolments and worries about the growth of the student body in relation to the school's facilities, the boarding program ended at the end of 2002, with the boarding house facilities being demolished or adapted into classrooms.

The school now admits small numbers of students from remote areas who take part in a home-stay program, residing with the families of local students.

Religious education 
As a school of the Lutheran Church of Australia, Luther College students participate in mandatory religious education classes in all years.

All students from all year levels attend a chapel service in the school's chapel four days out of the week.

The school's campus contains a special Ministry Centre which contains the offices of the school's two chaplains as well as the school counsellor.

IT program 

Students at all levels of Luther College use College-provided notebook computers, although senior students (years 10-12) are also permitted to enter a BYOD program. Whilst other students must use a school-provided and owned device, senior students own their devices and must purchase them from either the College or another vendor.

Involvement with Good Shepherd Lutheran Primary School 
Both Luther College and The Good Shepherd Lutheran Primary School are private schools, as well as schools of the Lutheran Church of Australia. Both their campuses are located in Croydon Hills, separated by two sporting ovals.

The schools share many of their facilities, including the sporting ovals, as well as the Luther College chapel which is used by the primary school for special occasions. The schools have very similar uniforms, and until 2004 their physical education uniforms were almost identical.

As many as 80% of Good Shepherd students attend Luther College after the completion of year 6, due to the school's close proximity and affordable fees. Due to this, students of the schools share a close relationship. Many collegiates undertake work experience or voluntary service placements at Good Shepherd, and both schools often present chapel services for each other.

There has been speculation since Good Shepherd's inception that the schools will one day join to become one college that provides education for all students years prep-12, as other private church schools including Methodist Ladies' College and Yarra Valley Grammar have successfully done, but there has been no official acknowledgement of this proposal from either school at any time.

Sport 
Luther is a member of the Eastern Independent Schools of Melbourne (EISM).

EISM premierships 
Luther has won the following EISM senior premierships.

Combined:

 Athletics (16) – 2003, 2004, 2005, 2006, 2009, 2010, 2011, 2012, 2013, 2014, 2015, 2016, 2017, 2018, 2019, 2021
 Cross Country (16) – 2001, 2002, 2003, 2004, 2006, 2009, 2010, 2011, 2012, 2013, 2014, 2015, 2016, 2017, 2018, 2019

Boys:

 Athletics (9) – 2005, 2006, 2009, 2010, 2011, 2012, 2018, 2019, 2021
 Basketball (7) – 1970, 1971, 1973, 1974, 1975, 1976, 2004
 Cricket (7) – 1971, 1988, 1990, 1996, 2013, 2014, 2018
 Cross Country (16) – 2000, 2001, 2002, 2003, 2004, 2009, 2010, 2011, 2012, 2013, 2014, 2015, 2016, 2017, 2018, 2019
 Football – 1976
 Handball – 2002
 Hockey (6) – 1992, 1994, 1995, 2003, 2004, 2006
 Indoor Soccer – 2008
 Soccer (3) – 1987, 1995, 2002
 Table Tennis (4) – 1978, 1982, 1984, 2015
 Tennis (5) – 1972, 1974, 1994, 1999, 2001
 Touch Rugby (4) – 2002, 2003, 2004, 2005
 Volleyball (7) – 1977, 1979, 1980, 1994, 1995, 1999, 2016

Girls:

 Athletics (15) – 2003, 2004, 2005, 2007, 2010, 2011, 2012, 2013, 2014, 2015, 2016, 2017, 2018, 2019, 2021
 Basketball (3) – 1977, 1978, 1986
 Bowling (2) – 2005, 2006
 Cricket – 2009
 Cross Country (17) – 2001, 2002, 2003, 2004, 2006, 2008, 2009, 2010, 2011, 2012, 2013, 2014, 2015, 2016, 2017, 2018, 2019
 Indoor Cricket – 2014
 Softball (2) – 1971, 1977
 Swimming (7) – 2000, 2012, 2014, 2015, 2019, 2020, 2021
 Tennis (9) – 1971, 1972, 1978, 1983, 1984, 1996, 2002, 2007, 2012
 Touch Rugby - 2022
 Volleyball (11) – 1977, 1989, 1992, 2001, 2002, 2003, 2004, 2005, 2015, 2016, 2017

Luther Year 9 EISM Premierships

Year 9 Boys:
 Badminton (3) - 2014, 2016, 2017
 Basketball (2) - 2014, 2019
 Football (2) - 2010, 2011
 Hockey (3) - 2013, 2014, 2017
 Indoor Cricket - 2017
 Lawn Bowls (4) - 2013, 2015, 2017, 2018
 Netball (4) - 2010, 2011, 2013, 2022
 Table Tennis (4) - 2011, 2013, 2017, 2019
 Touch Rugby (3) - 2011, 2014, 2016
 Soccer (3) - 2016, 2019, 2022
 Softball (3) - 2016, 2017, 2019
 Volleyball (6) - 2011, 2012, 2014, 2017, 2018, 2019

Year 9 Girls:
 Badminton - 2015
 Basketball (2) - 2013, 2016
 Football (2) - 2012, 2018
 Hockey (4) - 2012, 2013, 2014, 2015
 Indoor Cricket (5) - 2010, 2014, 2016, 2017, 2018
 Indoor Soccer - 2021
 Lawn Bowls (3) - 2016, 2017, 2018
 Netball - 2014
 Table Tennis (2) - 2016, 2017
 Tennis (6) - 2010, 2013, 2014, 2017, 2018, 2020
 Touch Rugby (5) - 2015, 2018, 2019, 2020, 2021
 Soccer - 2015
 Softball - 2013
 Ultimate Frisbee (2) - 2015, 2017
 Volleyball (6) - 2011, 2012, 2013, 2015, 2016, 2017

Notable alumni
 360 (Matthew Colwell) – hip hop artist
 Aaron Baddeley – golf player
 Sarah Blanck – Olympic representative for sailing
 Tom Boyd – former AFL player for the Western Bulldogs and the GWS Giants
 Greig Fraser – Oscar-nominated, Emmy Award–winning cinematographer
 Ash Grunwald – blues and roots artist 
 Daniel McStay – AFL player for the Brisbane Football Club
 Kathleen O'Kelly-Kennedy – Paralympian (bronze medal, basketball, Beijing 2008)
Ross Dunn - Competitive eater - 2019 Grandmaster champion Meatstock Sausage Sizzle Throwdown
 Paul Ahern - E-sports professional - Smash Brothers - regional champion 2002, Leisuresuit Larry - National runner-up 2019

References

Educational institutions established in 1964
Lutheran schools in Australia
Private secondary schools in Victoria (Australia)
Eastern Independent Schools of Melbourne
1964 establishments in Australia
High schools and secondary schools affiliated with the Lutheran Church
Buildings and structures in the City of Maroondah